Juliet Rose Landau is an American actress, director, producer, and ballerina best known for her role as Drusilla on Buffy the Vampire Slayer and its spinoff show Angel, the latter appearance earning her a Saturn Award nomination. She is also known for co-starring as Loretta King in Tim Burton's Ed Wood.

Early life
Landau was born in Los Angeles to actor parents Martin Landau and Barbara Bain. Both her parents were Jewish. Her older sister is film producer Susan Landau Finch. She spent her early childhood in West Los Angeles. Landau is a former professional ballerina.

Career
Landau starred in some independent films including Where The Road Runs Out, Fairfield, Monster Mutt, Citizens, Dark Hearts, The Yellow Wallpaper, Hack!, Toolbox Murders, Repossessed, Carlo's Wake, Life Among the Cannibals, Ravager, Direct Hit, and co-starred in Henry Jaglom's Going Shopping. She also starring in the Lifetime movie Fatal Reunion

Landau guest starred in television shows Criminal Minds, Millennium, La Femme Nikita and Strong Medicine. She voiced various characters in the animated series Justice League Unlimited and Ben 10 as well as the animated movie Green Lantern: First Flight. She has also voiced characters of the BioShock video games.

Landau's theater roles include Awake and Sing at the Pittsburgh Public Theater, the world premiere of Failure of Nerve, Danny and the Deep Blue Sea, A Streetcar Named Desire, Uncommon Women and Others, The Pushcart Peddlers, Billy Irish, We're Talking Today Here, the musical How To Steal An Election, Irish Coffee and the world premiere of musical The Songs of War. She played Natasha in a reading of Three Sisters, assembled by Al Pacino at The Actors Studio.

Landau's made her directorial debut in 2008's Take Flight, a short documentary film about Gary Oldman and his creative process. Oldman spoke positively about the experience. With her husband, Deverill Weekes, Landau co-directed Dream Out Loud, about make-up artist Kazuhiro Tsuji, who was branching into the world of fine art. The film captures one of his creations from inception to culmination, and features interviews with Guillermo del Toro, Joseph Gordon-Levitt and Rian Johnson.

In 2009, Landau co-wrote issues #24 and #25 of the Angel comic book series for IDW Publishing, in collaboration with Brian Lynch, with storylines featuring her Buffy and Angel character Drusilla. Landau also contributed numerous ideas and references for the cover and interior art of the issues, and has stated that she would like to write more comics set in the Buffyverse. She was slated to write a five-part Drusilla miniseries from Dark Horse Comics in 2014, which is now delayed.

In 2012–13, Landau produced and starred in the play Danny and the Deep Blue Sea directed by John McNaughton at the Crown City Theater in North Hollywood. Her portrayal won rave reviews and multiple awards, and the show was extended five times.

In July 2013, Landau was cast as a new incarnation of the Time Lord Romana in the audio dramas Gallifrey and Luna Romana, both of which are spin-offs from the BBC television series Doctor Who.

In 2019, Landau was cast as Rita Tedesco in the fifth season of Bosch on Amazon Prime Video.

In September 2019, Landau was cast as the vampire Hester, for the web series Vampire: The Masquerade - LA by Night. Her character was part a cabal of Tremere, vampires that can do blood sorcery, called the Wyrd Sisters.

Personal life
Landau is a member of the Actors Studio and in 2008 was being mentored by Mike Medavoy.

Filmography

Television

Film

Video games

Awards and nominations

References

External links

American ballerinas
American film actresses
American people of Austrian-Jewish descent
American people of Russian-Jewish descent
American television actresses
Jewish American actresses
Living people
Actresses from Los Angeles
American voice actresses
American stage actresses
American video game actresses
Female comics writers
American comics writers
Jewish American writers
21st-century American Jews
21st-century American women
Year of birth missing (living people)